Misson may refer to:

 Misson, Landes, a commune in the Landes department in France
 Misson, Nottinghamshire, a village in Nottinghamshire, England
 Frank Misson (born 1938), Australian cricketer
 Maximilien Misson (c.1650–1722), a French writer and traveller
 Misson Wines, see Livermore Valley AVA